Svetlana Vasina (born 19 November 1971) is a Kazakhstani ice hockey player. She competed in the women's tournament at the 2002 Winter Olympics.

References

External links
 

1971 births
Living people
Kazakhstani women's ice hockey forwards
Olympic ice hockey players of Kazakhstan
Ice hockey players at the 2002 Winter Olympics
Asian Games gold medalists for Kazakhstan
Medalists at the 2003 Asian Winter Games
Medalists at the 2007 Asian Winter Games
Asian Games medalists in ice hockey
Ice hockey players at the 2003 Asian Winter Games
Ice hockey players at the 2007 Asian Winter Games
Sportspeople from Almaty